Perito Moreno may refer to:

Francisco Moreno, Argentine explorer and scientist
Perito Moreno Glacier, at the Los Glaciares National Park in Santa Cruz Province, Argentina
Perito Moreno National Park, on the Northwest of the Santa Cruz Province in Argentina
Perito Moreno, Santa Cruz, a town in Argentina, near the Cueva de las Manos